Mellingen is a Verwaltungsgemeinschaft in the district Weimarer Land in Thuringia, Germany. The seat of the Verwaltungsgemeinschaft is in Mellingen.

The Verwaltungsgemeinschaft Mellingen consists of the following municipalities:

References

Verwaltungsgemeinschaften in Thuringia